NGC 7047 is an intermediate spiral galaxy located about 270 million light-years away in the constellation of Aquarius. NGC 7047 is also classified as a LINER-type galaxy. NGC 7047 has an estimated diameter of 127,350 light years. It was discovered by French astronomer Édouard Stephan on August 20, 1873. In 2009 a supernova was found in NGC 7047.

On January 1, 2009, a type II supernova designated as PTEo9cjq was discovered in NGC 7047.

See also 
 NGC 7038

References

External links 

Intermediate spiral galaxies
LINER galaxies
Aquarius (constellation)
7047
11712
66461
Astronomical objects discovered in 1873